Writers Without Homes is the sixth album by Piano Magic. Track 7, "Crown of the Lost", features vocals by Vashti Bunyan, her first vocal work since 1970.

Track listing 
 "(Music Won't Save You From Anything But) Silence" –  6:40
 "Postal" – 3:08
 "Modern Jupiter" – 4:41
 "(1.30)" – 1:31
 "The Season Is Long" – 8:43
 "Certainty" – 3:13
 "Crown of the Lost" – 4:14
 "It's the Same Dream That Lasts All Night" – '0:56
 "Dutch Housing" – 3:14
 "Already Ghosts" – 4:48
 "Shot Through the Fog" – 10:48

2002 albums
Piano Magic albums
4AD albums